Ahmose-Sapair (also -Sipair) was a prince of the late Seventeenth Dynasty of Egypt (1580 to 1550 BCE).

Family 
He was probably a son of Pharaoh Seqenenre Tao and a brother of Ahmose I or the child of Ahmose I.

Attestation 

During the Eighteenth Dynasty, he appears on several monuments. Such prominence is relatively rare in the case of princes who never ascended to the throne, so it has been suggested that he might be identical to the unknown father of Thutmose I, who succeeded Sapair's nephew, the childless Amenhotep I.

Burial
At Dra Abu el-Naga, shabits and funerary linen belonging to Ahmose-Sapair has been found. However, the mummy identified as his is that of a 5- to 6-year-old boy. The mummy was found in the Deir el-Bahari cache (DB320) in 1881 and was unwrapped by Grafton Elliot Smith and A. R. Ferguson on September 9, 1905. The location of his tomb is unknown, however it was still known during the inspection of tombs from the Twentieth Dynasty mentioned on the Abbott Papyrus.

References

External links

 His coffin and mummy

Princes of the Seventeenth Dynasty of Egypt
Princes of the Eighteenth Dynasty of Egypt
Ancient Egyptian mummies